Stuart Saunders Smith (born 16 March 1948) is an American composer and percussionist. After having studied composition and music theory at three music institutions, Smith is currently based in Vermont, United States, with his wife Sylvia. He has produced almost 200 compositions, half of which were written for percussion instruments with a focus on the vibraphone.

Life
Smith was born in Portland, Maine. He started studying composition and percussion at six years old with Charles Newcomb, who was previously a vaudeville performer and exposed him to many musical styles e.g. Latin music, waltz, Dixieland. Smith has attributed a "physical" form of music composition to Newcomb. From the age of 13, Smith began performing publicly in clubs and dance venues. At the age of 18, Smith went on to Berklee School of Music where he furthered his studies in counterpoint, harmony and musical arrangements.  He continued to study percussion and composition at Hartt College of Music (1967–1972) and the University of Illinois at Urbana (1973–1977). Alongside Newcomb, his other percussion teachers included Fred Budha, Al Dawson, Alexander Lepak, and Thomas Siwe.

Music
Smith has composed over 150 works. In categorizing Smith's work, four primary areas of focus have been identified: music of extreme rhythmic and melodic intricacy; musical mobiles with instrumental parts that freely interact; text-based compositions; trans-media systems for any kind of performing artist(s). Smith uses language (in the form of body language, melody and speech) as the core of each of these styles.

Smith's percussion-theater music forms the core of that literature with notable pieces includingPoems I II III, ...And Points North, Tunnels, Clay Singing and twenty-six compositions of that genre.

Smith has recorded with compositions on labels such as New World Records, Ravello Records, Centaur, Innova, 11 West Records, O.O. Discs, Equilibrium, GAC, Soundset Recordings, and Chen Li.

In addition, anthologies of new music have included his theater music, and music of rhythmic intricacy: Here and There, MacMillan Publishing, New York City; Return and Recall, Assembling Press, New York City; Faces, ASUC, New York City; and Transitions and Leaps, Mark Batty Publications, New York City. Articles on his music have been published regularly throughout the years in such journals as: Perspectives of New Music, Percussive Notes, Interface, and ex tempore.

Writings
Smith is the author of several articles on his music and the music of others. There have also been a number of articles written about Smith's music.

Perspectives of New Music

"Communications" by Stuart Smith
 Vol. 11, no. 2, pp. 269–277 (1973)

"A Portrait of Herbert Brün" by Stuart Smith and Sylvia Smith
 Vol. 17, no. 2, pp. 56–75 (1979)

"Visual Music" by Sylvia Smith and Stuart Smith
 Volume 20, no. 1–2, pp. 75–93 (1981)

"A Composer’s Mosaic" by Stuart Smith
 Vol. 22, no. 1–2, pp. 275–285 (1983)

"Return and Recall (Improvisation – The First Step) at U. M. B. C." by Stuart Smith
 Vol. 22, no. 1–2, pp. 286–289 (1983)

"Notes on Stuart Smith’s Return and Recall: A View From Within" by Linda Fiore
 Vol. 22, no. 1–2, pp. 290–302 (1983)

"Aussie Blue (Day in the Summer in 1985) for Piano (Pianist Also Plays Triangle and Sings) Commissioned by Chris Mann" by Stuart Saunders Smith
 Vol. 26, no. 2, pp. 300–305 (1988)

"Against Definition" by Stuart Smith
 Vol. 32, no. 1, pp. 214–218 (1994)

"To Suffer Music" by Stuart Smith
 Vol. 34, no. 1, pp. 106–112 (1996)

"Showing and Saying" by Stuart Smith
 Vol. 34, no. 1, pp. 116–121 (1996)

"Inner-views: A Conversation between Stuart Saunders Smith and Tom Goldstein" by Stuart Saunders Smith and Tom Goldstein
 Vol. 36, no. 2, pp. 187–199 (1998)

"Stuart Saunders Smith's Links No. 6 (Song Interiors): How Can I Tell what I Think Until I See What I Sing?" by Ron Hess
 Vol. 47, no. 1, pp. 211–232 (2009)

"Interview with Stuart Saunders Smith" by Kristina Der
 Vol. 55, no. 2, pp. 219–233 (2017)

Percussive Notes

"Music Notation as Visual Art" by Sylvia Smith and Stuart Smith
 Vol. 20, No. 1, pp. 49–54 (1981)

"Focus on Performance: The Noble Snare – A Concert of Snare Drum Solos" by Brian Johnson
 Vol. 28, No. 1, pp. 52–54 (1989)

"Having Words With John Cage" by Stuart Saunders Smith
 Vol. 30, No. 3, pp. 48–52 (1992)

"Percussion in Discussion (Language, Percussion, and My Speech Songs)" by Stuart Saunders Smith
 Vol. 31, No. 8, pp. 71–73 (1993)

"Thinking On Tools – Touching My Trade – or – The Touch in Time Is Mine" by Stuart Saunders Smith
 Vol. 31, No. 8, pp. 74–79 (1993)

"Percussion Ecology: Doing More With Less – Music for a Small Planet" by Stuart Saunders Smith
 Vol. 32, No. 1, pp. 62–63 (1994)

"Against Definition" by Stuart Saunders Smith
 Vol. 32, No. 1, pp. 63–64 (1994)

"Showing and Saying (1994)" by Stuart Saunders Smith
 Vol. 33, No. 2, pp. 68–70 (1995)

"The Links Series of Vibraphone Essays: A Personal View/A Concert Review" by Christopher Shultis
 Vol. 34, no. 3, pp. 70–74 (1996)

"An Interview with Sylvia Smith on the 30th Anniversary of Smith Publications and Sonic Arts Editions" by Carrie Rose
 Vol. 42, No. 4, pp. 74–79 (2004)

"The Geography of Time: The Links Series of Vibraphone Essays (1974–1994)" by Stuart Saunders Smith
 Vol. 43, No. 2, pp. 58–62 (2005)

"The History and Significance of The Noble Snare" by Jason Baker
 Vol. 44, No. 3, pp. 72–77 (2006)

"Stuart Saunders Smith's Links No. 6 (Song Interiors) How Can I Tell What I Think Until I See What I Sing?" by Ron Hess
 Vol. 48, No. 3, pp. 42–50 (2010)

"Stuart Saunders Smith’s Ground for Solo Glockenspiel: Clear Complexity" by Rob Falvo
 Vol. 49, no. 3, pp. 42–49 (2011)

"Interview with Stuart Smith: On the Formation and Early Years of the PAS New Music/Research Committee" by Dr. Eugene Novotney
 Vol. 49, No.5, pp. 32–33 (2011)

"The Silence… An Introduction to the Inner World of Stuart Saunders Smith" by Jose "Zeca" Lacerda
 Vol. 50, no. 6, pp. 40–47 (2012)

"Amidst the Noise: Stuart Saunders Smith’s Percussion Music" by Jeremy Muller
 Vol. 52, no. 4, pp. 6–15 (2014)

"Night Suite: Interviews with Stuart Saunders Smith and Berndt Thurner" by Rose Martin
 Vol. 56, no.3, pp. 20–25 (2018)

Percussive Notes Research Edition

"Music Notation as Visual Art" by Sylvia Smith and Stuart Smith
 Vol. 18, no. 2, pp. 7–14 (1981)

"Interview with John Cage" by Dr. Stuart Smith
 Vol. 21, No. 3, pp. 3–7 (1983)

"Stuart Smith’s Links Series" by John P. Welsh
 Vol. 23, No. 3, pp. 75–89 (1983)

"Lecture by Dr. Thomas DeLio" by Dr. Thomas DeLio
 Vol. 22, No. 6, pp. 76–81 (1984)

"Scribing Sound" by Sylvia Smith
 Vol. 23, No. 3, pp. 34–51 (1985)

Percussionist

"Avant Garde Percussion" by Stuart Smith
 Vol. 10, No. 1, pp. 3–4 (1972)

"The Early Percussion Music of John Cage" by Stuart Smith
 Vol. 16, No. 1, pp. 16–27 (1978)

"Lou Harrison’s 'Fugue' for Percussion" by Stuart Smith
 Vol. 16, No. 2, pp. 47–56 (1979)

Interface

"Music in the Air Here and There – A Radio Landscape" by John P. Welsh
 Vol. 13, No. 4, pp. 199–223 (1984)

"Viewing Mobile Minds: Stuart Smith's Gifts" by John P. Welsh
 Vol. 16, No. 4, pp. 219–245 (1987)

ex tempore

"Thoughts of Stuart Saunders Smith on Quakerism, Trans-Media and Democracy" by Stuart Smith and Christine Humphries 
 Vol. 7, No. 2 (1995)

"Family Portraits: 'Delbert (great-grandfather)' and Self Interview on the Thirtieth Year of Smith Publications and Sonic Art Editions" by Sylvia Smith
 Vol. 13, No. 2 (2007)

"A Composer’s Mosaic: Selected Entries from the Composing Journals of Stuart Saunders Smith (1985–1986)" by Stuart Saunders Smith
 Vol. 14, No. 1 (2008)

"Interview with Stuart Saunders Smith" by Jude Traxler
 Vol. 14, No. 1 (2008)

Smith is the author of two books: Twentieth Century Music Scores, an anthology, (Prentice-Hall, 1989), co-edited with Thomas DeLio; Words and Spaces, an anthology, (University Press, 1989), co-authored with Thomas DeLio. In addition, he is currently writing Composing, Thoughts, a book of experimental writings about aesthetics, language, composition, listening, and religion. Part I of this book was published in The Modern Percussion Revolution: Journeys of the Progressive Artist, edited by Kevin Lewis and Gustavo Aguilar (Routledge, 2014). John P. Welsh's The Music of Stuart Saunders Smith is published by Greenwood Press (1995).

Smith's service works on the behalf of music includes organizing hundreds of concerts of new music, functioning as a lobbyist for the arts for the American Society of University Composers during the Reagan presidency, and as Executive Editor of Percussive Notes, Research Edition from 1982 to 1984.

Awards
His awards and honors include three UMBC Research Grants, The Hartt College Distinguished Alumni Award, East/West Artist Award, three Maryland State Artists Fellowships, the National Endowment for the Arts Composer's Fellowship, Percussive Arts Society Service Award and the Atlantic Center's Master Artist Award.

Testimonials
When Smith chose the title "Links" for his ongoing series of compositions for vibraphone, he provided us with the most suggestive mode of biographical entry and subsequent inquiry, for his links are not only intra- and inter-compositional, but between and among his vocations as composer, performer, teacher, writer, anthologist, editor, entrepreneur, philomath, and musical activist.

When as a young man from Maine he ventured out into our hypercompartmentalized, ultrapluristic compositional society, he was disposed to be no one's follower, and so his music has displayed no more the explicit influences of the succession of strong-willed composition teachers with whom he studied and from whom he surely learned than that of jazz which he professes to be (or, at least, to have been) his primary musical influence. For he has forged a personalized seamless musical compound, a vast collection of awarenesses fused into a unified, single, and singular vision in which the individual sources retain little of their literal characteristics. (Milton Babbitt, quoted in )

Smith has done very important and unique work in the fields of open-form composition and jazz. He comes to this approach naturally, for two reasons: first, as a percussionist he is comfortable with notation which diverges from the traditional mainstream in a number of ways; and second, as a jazz performer he is at home with improvisation. There is even a third reason, perhaps somewhat less obvious than these: because poetic consciousness is so fundamental to Smith, his musical thinking often results in compositions that seem to transcend music itself. This leads him to a view of artistic composition which is not tied either to ratiocination or to expression. It is not that his art is lacking in logic or in expressive effect but rather that its center of gravity is elsewhere. (Ben Johnston, quoted in )

Compositions
1970

 Poems I, II, III for five brake drums and narrator
 One for Syl for solo vibraphone

1971

One for Two for alto saxophone and organ
A Gift for Bessie for violin, piano, bassoon, and percussion

1972

Here and There for shortwave radio, piano interior (percussion) and any melody instrument or voice
Legacy Variations No. 1 for any three sustaining melody instruments
Legacy Variations No. 99 for any three sustaining melody instruments
Three for Two for violin and viola
Two for Four for percussion quartet (orchestra bells, vibraphone, cymbal, large and medium gong, xylophone, marimba, timpani, temple blocks, and various small percussion instruments).

1973

Rock Garden for organ and two percussion

1974

Faces for oboe and clarinet
Gifts for keyboard and any two melody instruments
Links for solo vibraphone

1975

Links no. 2 for solo vibraphone
Links no. 3 for solo vibraphone

1976

Return and Recall / Initiatives and Reactions: Studies in the Concept of Group Composition performance systems for actors, dancers, musicians, mimes, etc.

1977
 Pinetop for solo piano

1978
 Flight for flute and piano

1979
 Blue for trumpet, drum set and double bass

1980
 Notebook for any instruments in any combination
 Notebook, Part II for one or two pianos (may be played with Notebook)
1981
 Songs I–IX for percussionist-actor (small percussion instruments and various household items from kitchen)
1982
 Tunnels a solo music-text-theater composition for keyboard, string, or multiple percussion
 Links No. 4 (Monk) for solo vibraphone
1983
 Blue Too for solo drum set
 By Language Embellished: I percussion / theater opera for speaking voice
1984
 Some Household Words I–XVI for solo speaking voice
1985
 Aussie Blue for solo piano
 In Bingham for solo speaker/narrator
1987
 Links No. 5 (Sitting on the Edge of Nothing) for solo vibraphone with offstage orchestra bells and chimes
1988
 The Noble Snare for solo snare drum

1989
 Links No. 6 (Song Interiors) for vibraphone and piano
 Links No. 7 (New England Night Weave) for solo vibraphone
1990
 ...And Points North a music-theater work for solo percussionist/narrator (wood block, small Peking opera gong, Tibetan cymbal, glass wind chimes, owl hooter, hawk screamer, pod rattles, Audubon bird call, "found" instruments from the city and the woods)
 Transitions and Leaps for two or more performers performing any sounds/actions
1991
 "as if time would heal by its passing for solo marimba
 Family Portraits: Sylvia (wife) for solo piano
 Family Portraits: Ivy (grandmother) for solo piano
 Family Portraits: Earle (father) for solo piano
 Hawk for solo oboe
 In Common for flute and vibraphone
 Links No. 8 (Confessions-Witness to 48 Things) for vibraphone with flute
 Nightshade for violin or medium voice and two percussionists, each playing orchestra bells (glockenspiel), tam-tam or gong, two cymbals, two triangles
1992
 Good Night for solo marimba
 Links No. 9 (Mosque) for solo vibraphone
 Meetings for flute, vibraphone and piano
1993
 Each Moment and Ending for keyboard percussion quintet
 Part for flute, piano, and cello
 Thaw for solo orchestra bells (glockenspiel)
 Links No. 10 (Who Are We? Where Are We?) for solo vibraphone
1994
 Family Portraits: Brenda (first cousin) for solo piano
 Links No. 11 (Regions I–XXI) for three vibraphones
 Wind in the Channel for solo tenor recorder
1995
 Family Portraits: Delbert (great-grandfather) for percussionist/narrator (playing woodblock, logs, and newspaper)
 Strays for xylophone and tenor recorder or flute
1996
 Family Portraits: Cubba (grandfather) for trumpet, flute, and five percussion (tom-toms and triangles)
 Family Portraits: Mom and Dad Together for solo double bass
 Polka in Treblinka for percussion trio (bass drum, xylophone, snare drum and high hat)
1997
 Family Portrait: Self (in 14 stations) for solo piano
 The Night is Never Long for piccolo and xylophone
1998
 Closing for solo guitar
 Fences in Three Tragedies for solo piano
 When Music is Missing, Music Sings for two percussionists playing five "found" instruments each
1999
 All That is Left orchestra bells (glockenspiel) duet
 And Sometimes the Ears for solo tenor steel drum
 Even Song for solo orchestra bells (glockenspiel)
 Leaving for solo marimba
2000
 Books of Flutes for solo flute
 Bones for percussion, piano, and 3 or 4 melody instruments
 Endless for two flutes and two vibraphones
 The Geography of Streams for percussion trio (xylophone solo with two sets of orchestra bells, two bass drums, claves, and woodblocks)
 Thinking About Anne Sexton duo for vibraphone and speaking voice
2001
 Breath for mezzo-soprano and orchestra bells (glockenspiel)
 Family Portraits: Ligeia (daughter) for soprano voice and piano
 Light A Dew for solo double bass
 Minor for solo violin

2002

Asleep in Thorns for guitar and flute
Brush for solo drum set
Dad's Time Had Come for solo xylophone
Dead Reckoning for tenor recorder trio
Things That Grow Smaller for flute, clarinet, bassoon, piano, and percussion
Two Lights for solo drum set

2003
 Family Portraits: Embden Pond for solo alto flute with two vibraphones
 Willow for solo cello
 Wounded an antiphonal composition for 3 or 4 xylophones

2004

Hearts for solo violin
Ground for solo orchestra bells (glockenspiel)
Plenty thirty-four movements for solo vibraphone

2005
 Clay Singing for solo percussion with spoken text
 Family Portraits: Erika (daughter) for vibraphone and violin
 In Hours Like These for soprano voice and orchestra bells (glockenspiel)
 A River, Rose for violin and vibraphone
 When The Body Betrays for tenor voice and double seconds steel drums
 Women in Meeting flute duet
2006
 The Authors for solo marimba with spoken text
 Big Falls, Little Falls for percussion quartet and off-stage percussion ensemble (4)
 Castine for marimba with offstage voice
 Magdalene for soprano saxophone and two percussion
 Over for solo orchestra bells (glockenspiel)
 Rose for flute with spoken text and movement
 A Vietnam Memorial opera for speaking voice and vibraphone
2007
 Among Us for solo piano
 Light for two voices
 Light in Each One for solo alto flute
 The Lines of Ageing for solo vibraphone
 The Narrow Path trio for two vibraphones and orchestra bells (glockenspiel)
 Quilt for vibraphone and orchestra bells
 Seven Seasons for contralto voice and vibraphone
 Angels for percussion trio, three triangles each
 as the days get shorter for solo bass clarinet (revised 2018)
2008
 Mornings for solo vibraphone
 Apart for 2 orchestra bells and vibraphone
 The Narrow Path for 2 vibraphones and orchestra bells
 Family Portraits: Justin for vibraphone/voice
 Shine for piccolo and orchestra bells
2009
 The Home of the Brave for percussionist/actor performing on a 2X4, 3 bottles, and 5 metal objects
 To Freshen the Moment for cello and vibraphone
 Far Away for solo chimes
 Wait for solo marimba
 GodSongs for actor singer and orchestra bells (one player) (revised 2018)
2010
 Time Comes Full Circle for cello and violin
 Thicket for orchestra bells or piano
 All Too Human for soprano and clarinet
 Winter, Knee Deep for flute/theater
 They Looked Like Strangers for solo vibraphone
 Winter Songs for violin/theater
2011
 Three Winter Carols for orchestra bells/voice
 Winter for any winds, strings, keyboard, mallet percussion
 New England for vibraphone
2012
 Palm Sunday for piano
 A Liturgy of the Hours for flute
 Our Father for soprano
 Heaven and Earth for organ
 Five Books for orchestra bells
2013
 Blessings for soprano and clarinet
 A Good Friday for clarinet
 By Hand for bongos
 The Lilies of the Field for vibraphone and female voice
 Across: Lines for orchestra bells/xylophone/vibraphone/marimba/chimes/voice, one player
 My Friend Gita Said: for marimba/voice
 Lyric for percussion theater
 The Shapes Beneath the Ground for marimba
2014
 Crystal Night for violin and percussion quartet
 Memory for any soloist
 Lazarus for piano or vibraphone/actor/singer
 Past Regrets for double bass/singer/actor or cello
 Lady Slippers for harp, viola, alto flute
 Queen Anne's Lace for vibraphone
 The Deep for vibraphone
2015
 Re:Verse trans-media work for any two performance artists
 Wellspring for orchestra bells
 Echo for 1–8 singers
 Evening Primrose for vibraphone solo with two drumsets
 Commune, vibraphone concerto with small chamber ensemble
 Meadow Sweet for marimba and clarinet
 Here's the Sun for cello solo
2016
 Inner Light for solo violin
 Halo for solo vibraphone
 The Circle of Light for flute solo and eight luminists/actors
 Family Portraits: Our Home for soprano voice and vibraphone
 Easter in Bingham for alto saxophone and actor/vibraphone
 Milk and Honey for vibraphone and harp
 Alone for solo vibraphone
 Men's Culture for soprano saxophone and xylophone, two actors
 My Romance for solo orchestra bells or vibraphone or piano
 Alone in a Room for solo orchestra bells and percussion quartet (triangles)
2017
 Emily for jazz/electric guitar and piano
 Mercy for large percussion orchestra
 Dignity for soprano voice, vibraphone, and actor
 History for marimba, vibraphone, and piano
 When We Were Giants for guitar (2014–2017)
 The Untold Range for 3–5 percussionists, chimes, and pre-recorded environmental sounds
 Lace for orchestra bells duet and soprano
2018
 as the days get shorter for solo bass clarinet
 Envelope Poems for vibraphonist / vocalist and offstage melody instrument
 Winter Taps for 2 actors and vibraphone duet
 Lace for orchestra bells duet and soprano
 Honesty for flute and vibraphone
 Family Portraits: Harriet for vibraphone
 Family Portraits: Harpreet for violin and vibraphone
 Holy Week for vibraphone
 Compassion for vibraphone
 My Better Angel for vibraphone
 Family Portraits: Self at 70 for flute, double bass, and drumset
 Family Portraits: Sylvia at 70 for pian
2019
 Afterlife concerto for marimba with large percussion orchestra
 Poetry for marimba and actor/actress
 A Friend's End for actor/actress and offstage flute and chimes
 Regrets for double bass and soprano
 Older Years for alto flute and actor
 The Vibraphone Poems for vibraphone and voice (one player)
 Peace for bass flute, flute, piccolo (one player)
 Eternity for solo vibraphone
 Love for violin and piano
2020
 Shattered for solo drum set
 Renoir's Piano for piano, vibraphone, and flute
 Past for marimba solo
 East of Eden for soprano saxophone and drum set
 Inner Light for violin, piano, and vibraphone
 Dusk for steel band
 Cries and Whispers for vibraphone and speaking/singing voice (one player)
 Shoreline for viola and vibraphone
 Emotion for large percussion ensemble
 Happy Hour for solo vibraphone
2021
 Sadness for double bass and soprano voice
 Life for piano and voice (one player)
 Sadness for double bass and soprano
 Some Household Words for sound text percussion duo
 Tears for vibraphone and string quartet
 Letters for guitar and voice (one player)
 Past for solo marimba
 Another Echo for any wind or string instrument and piano or vibraphone
 To All of Those for any string or woodwind instrument
 Vermont Chimes for chimes, two glockenspiels, two bass drums, and two triangles
 Violets for solo drum set

Books
Smith, Stuart Saunders. Twentieth Century Scores. Prentice-Hall.
Smith, Stuart Saunders, and Thomas DeLio (1989). Words and Spaces: An Anthology of Twentieth Century Musical Experiments in Language and Sonic Environments. University Press of America. . .

Discography
Wind in the Channel, O.O. Disc (Out of Print)
1. Hawk (1991), solo oboe
2. Family Portraits: Brenda (1994), solo piano
3. California Driving (1995), solo voice
4. Return and Recall (1976)
5. Notebook (1980), 2-piano version
6. Wind in the Channel (1994), tenor recorder/voice/percussion
7. Gifts (1974), flute, vibraphone, piano
8. Pinetop (1976–1977), solo piano
9. In Bingham (1985), solo voice
10. Aussie Blue (1985), solo piano
Music/Theater, Centaur (CRC 2633)
1. by Language Embellished: I (1983–1984), solo voice/percussion
The Year Begins to Be Ripe, 11 West Records/Smith Publications
1. Poems I, II, III (1970), 5 brake drums, narrator
2. In Hours Like These (2005), soprano, orchestra bells
3. Family Portraits: Delbert (1994), percussion/voice
4. Xylophone Poems No. 1: Went Forth (1999), xylophone/voice
5. Thinking About Anne Sexton, vibraphone (2000), narrator
The Noble Snare, 11 West Records/Smith Publications
1. The Noble Snare (1988), solo snare drum
Breath, 11 West Records/Smith Publications
1. Each Moment An Ending (1993), marimba, xylophone, vibraphone, orchestra bells, chimes
2. Blue Too (1981–1983), solo drumset
3. ...And Points North (1990), percussion/voice
4. Links No. 11 (1994), 3 vibraphones
5. Breath (2001), mezzo-soprano, orchestra bells
6. Polka in Treblinka (1996), xylophone, snare drum, high-hat, bass drum
7. Thaw (1993), orchestra bells
8. Family Portraits: Cubba (1996), trumpet, percussion, flute
Withered Leaves – New Birth, Disques Christal (France)
1. Links (1974), vibraphone
2. Links No. 2 (1975), vibraphone
3. Links No. 3 (1975), vibraphone
In Common, Equilibrium
1. In Common (1991), flute, vibraphone
Book of Horizons, New World Records
1. Fences, In Three Tragedies (1998), solo piano
When Still, Soundset Recordings
1. Links No. 2 (1975), vibraphone
2. The Starving Month (2012), vibraphone
McCormick Percussion Group, Ravello Records
1. Nightshade (1991), violin, 2 percussion
Trio Spectra, GAC (Sweden)
1. Polka in Treblinka (1996), xylophone, snare drum, high-hat, bass drum
At Sixty (Selections), 11 West Records/Smith Publications
CD#1
1. Women in Meeting (2005), flute duo
2. Polka in Treblinka (1996), xylophone, snare drum, high-hat, bass drum
3. Over (2006), orchestra bells
4. Wounded (2003), xylophone
5. Magdalene (2006), soprano sax, 2 percussion
6. Notebook (1980), any instruments
CD#2
1. In Bingham (1985), solo voice
2. Rose (2006), flute/dancer/actor
3. Family Portraits: Embden Pond (2003), alto flute, 2 vibraphones
4. A River, Rose (2005), violin, vibraphone
5. Hearts (2004), violin
6. Good Night (1992), marimba/voice
Books of Flutes, 11 West Records/Smith Publications
1. Books of Flutes (2000), solo flute
2. Legacy Variations No. 1 (1972), any three melody instruments
3. Legacy Variations No. 99 (1972), any three melody instruments
4. Family Portraits: Embden Pond (2003), alto flute, 2 vibraphones
Crux, Chen Li Music
1. Notebook (1980), any instruments
2. Family Portraits: Ivy, Earle, Sylvia (1991), solo piano
3. Here and There (1972), short-wave radio, piano interior, any melody instruments
4. Strays (1995), tenor recorder and xylophone
Strange Paths, Innova
1. They Looked Like Strangers (2010), vibraphone
Music for Keyboard Percussions, Ravello
1. Apart (2008), 2 orchestra bells, vibraphone
The Isle is Full of Noises, Centaur (CRC 3091)
1. Family Portraits: Embden Pond (2003), alto flute, 2 vibraphones
The Links Series of Vibraphone Essays, New World Records
The Links Series
Links-Links 11, vibraphone
A River Rose, New World Records
1. Hearts (2004), violin
2. Three for Two (1972), violin and viola
3. A Gift for Bessie (1971), violin, piano, bassoon, percussion
4. Minor (2001), violin
5. A River Rose (2005), violin, vibraphone
6. I've Been Here Before (2009), violin and piano
Hawk – The Saxophone Music of Stuart Saunders Smith, Chen Li Music
1. Notebook (1980), any instruments
2. Magdalene (2006), soprano sax and 2 percussion
3. Husbands and Wives (2008), alto sax duet
4. Hawk (2007), soprano sax solo
5. One for Two (1971), alto sax and organ
Plot: Music for Unspecified Instrumentation, Ravello Records
1. Bones (2000), for any musicians and piano
2. Winter (2010–2011), any instruments and voices
Full Circle – NOISE Plays the Music of Stuart Saunders Smith, Centaur Records
1. Flight (1978), for flute and piano
2. Notebook (1980), any instruments
3. Time Comes Full Circle (2010), for violin and cello
4. Asleep in Thorns (2002), for flute and guitar
5. Women in Meeting (2005), for two flutes
Pluralities, Chen Li Music
1. Lazarus, for piano and voice
Lisa Cella – Shine, Chen Li Music
4. Light in Each One, for solo flute
5. Shine, for flute and orchestra bells
New England, Kairos
1–11. New England, for solo vibraphone
Palm Sunday, New World Records
1. Thicket (2010), for solo piano or orchestra bells
2. Pinetop (1977), for solo piano
3. Family Portraits: Self (in 14 Stations) (1997), for solo piano
4. Palm Sunday (2012), for solo piano
5. Among Us (2007), for solo piano
At Seventy: The Percussion Music of Stuart Saunders Smith, Chen Li Music
CD#1
1. Blue Too (1983), for solo drumset
2. Brush (2002), for solo drumset
3. Two Lights (2002), for solo drumset
4. Family Portraits: Erika (daughter) (2005), for vibraphone and violin
5. Dad's Time Had Come (2002), for solo xylophone
6. Far Away (2009), for solo chimes
7. Good Night (1992), for solo marimba
CD#2
1. Queen Anne Lace (2014), for solo vibraphone
2. The Narrow Path (2008), for orchestra bells, and two vibraphones
3. Mercy (2017), for large percussion orchestra
CD#3
1. Home of the Brave (2009), for spoken voice and junk
2. Links No. 4 (Monk) (1982), for solo vibraphone
3. Wait (2009), for solo marimba
4. Songs I–IX (1981), for spoken voice and junk
5. Poems I, II, III (1970), for brake drums and spoken voice
6. Quilt (2007), for vibraphone and orchestra bells
7. One For Syl (1970), for solo vibraphone
7. Wellspring (2015), for solo orchestra bells
CD#4
1. by Language Embellished: I (1983), for solo percussion theater
2. The Lilies of the Field (2013), for soprano and vibraphone
3. A Vietnam Memorial (2006), for speaking voice and vibraphone
CD#5
1. The Authors (2006), for solo marimba with spoken text
2. Angels (2007), for percussion trio
3. Geography of Streams (2000), for percussion trio
4. Two for Four (1972), for percussion quartet
5. Rockgarden (1973), for organ and two percussion
CD#6 (Bonus Disc) Wind in the Channel
1. Hawk (1991), solo oboe
2. Family Portraits: Brenda (1994), solo piano
3. California Driving (1995), solo voice
4. Return and Recall (1976)
5. Notebook (1980), 2-piano version
6. Wind in the Channel (1994), tenor recorder/voice/percussion
7. Gifts (1974), flute, vibraphone, piano
8. Pinetop (1976–1977), solo piano
9. In Bingham (1985), solo voice
10. Aussie Blue (1985), solo piano

References

Sources

External links
"About Stuart Saunders Smith", newmusiccoop.org
Breath (2001)

1948 births
20th-century classical composers
American percussionists
Musicians from Portland, Maine
Living people
Musicians from Baltimore
University of Illinois at Urbana–Champaign School of Music alumni
University of Maryland, Baltimore County faculty
University of Hartford Hartt School alumni
Male classical composers
20th-century American composers
20th-century American male musicians